Aleksandr Igorevich Kozhevnikov (born 18 April 1990) is a Russian professional football official and a former player. He is currently a scout with FC Yenisey Krasnoyarsk.

Club career
He played two seasons in the Russian Football National League for FC Dynamo Bryansk and FC Yenisey Krasnoyarsk.

External links
 Player page by sportbox.ru
 
 

1990 births
Sportspeople from Krasnoyarsk
Living people
Russian footballers
Association football defenders
FC Spartak Moscow players
FC Dynamo Bryansk players
FC Yenisey Krasnoyarsk players
FC Smena Komsomolsk-na-Amure players